The Chopin University of Music (UMFC) is a musical conservatorium and academy located in central Warsaw, Poland. It is the oldest and largest music school in Poland, and one of the largest in Europe.

History

Named for the Polish composer Frédéric Chopin (whose birth name was Fryderyk Chopin and who studied there from 1826 to 1829), the University dates from the Music School for singers and theatre actors that was founded in 1810 by Wojciech Bogusławski. In 1820 it was transformed by Chopin's subsequent teacher, Józef Elsner, into a more general school of music, the Institute of Music and Declamation; it was then affiliated with the University of Warsaw and, together with the University, was dissolved by Russian imperial authorities during the repressions that followed the November 1830 Uprising. In 1861 it was revived as Warsaw's Institute of Music.

After Poland regained independence in 1918, the Institute was taken over by the Polish state and became known as the Warsaw Conservatory. The institution's old main building was destroyed during World War II, in the Warsaw Uprising. After the war, in 1946, the school was recreated as the Higher State School of Music. In 1979 the school assumed the name: Fryderyk Chopin Music Academy. In 2008 the school once again changed its name to the Chopin University of Music.

Buildings

The main building, at ulica Okólnik 2 in Central Warsaw, was constructed between 1960 and 1966. It contains 62 sound-proof classrooms; a concert hall (486 seats), the Szymanowski Lecture Theater (adapted for film projection; 155 seats), the Melcer Chamber Music Hall (196 seats and a Walcker organ sampled by Piotr Grabowski), the Moniuszko Opera Hall (53 seats), a rhythmics room, three music-recording and sound-track studios, a tuner's studio, a library and reading room, rector's offices, deans' offices, management offices, guest rooms, the GAMA cafeteria, and doctor's and dentist's clinics. There is also a music book shop and antiquarian book shop.

The University also has its own dormitory, Dziekanka, at 58/60 Krakowskie Przedmieście. The latter has its own 150-seat concert hall.

Structure
The University is divided into the following departments:

 
 Department of Symphony and Orchestra Conducting
 Department of Composition and Theory of Music
 Department of Instrumental Studies
 Department of Vocal and Acting Studies
 Department of Choir Conducting and Choir Studies, Music Education and Rhythmics
 Department of Sound Engineering
 Department of Church Music
 Department of Dance
 Department of Jazz and Stage Music
 Department of Instrumental and Educational Studies, Music Education and Vocal Studies in Białystok

Directors and rectors

 Wojciech Bogusławski (1810–1814)
 Ludwik Osiński (1814−1816)
 Józef Elsner (1816–1830)
 Apolinary Kątski (1861−1879)
 Aleksander Zarzycki (1879−1888)
 Rudolf Strobl (1888−1891)
 Gustaw Roguski (1891−1903)
 Emil Młynarski (1903−1907)
 Stanisław Barcewicz (1910−1918)
 Emil Młynarski (1919−1922)
 Henryk Melcer-Szczawiński (1922−1927)
 Karol Szymanowski (1927−1929)
 Zbigniew Drzewiecki (1929−1930)
 Karol Szymanowski (1930–1931)
 Zbigniew Drzewiecki (1931–1932)
 Eugeniusz Morawski-Dąbrowa (1932−1939)
 Kazimierz Sikorski (1940−1944)
 Stanisław Kazuro (1945−1951)
 Stanisław Szpinalski (1951−1957)
 Kazimierz Sikorski (1957−1966)
 Teodor Zalewski (1966−1969)
 Tadeusz Paciorkiewicz (1969−1971)
 Regina Smendzianka (1972−1973)
 Tadeusz Wroński (1973−1975)
 Tadeusz Maklakiewicz (1975−1978)
 Bogusław Madey (1978−1981)
 Andrzej Rakowski (1981−1987)
 Kazimierz Gierżod (1987−1993)
 Andrzej Chorosiński (1993−1999)
 Ryszard Zimak (1999−2005)
 Stanisław Moryto (2005−2012)
 Ryszard Zimak (2012−2016)
 Klaudiusz Baran (from 2016)

Doctors honoris causa

 Igor Bełza
 Nadia Boulanger
 Plácido Domingo
 Jan Ekier
 Joachim Grubich
 Andrzej Jasiński
 Witold Lutosławski
 Andrzej Panufnik
 Arvo Pärt
 Krzysztof Penderecki
 Jean-Pierre Rampal
 Mstislav Rostropovich
 Arthur Rubinstein
 Witold Rudziński
 Jerzy Semkow
 Kazimierz Sikorski
 Stefan Śledziński
 Regina Smendzianka
 Stefan Sutkowski
 Tadeusz Wroński

Notable professors

 Tadeusz Baird
 Henryk Czyż
 Zbigniew Drzewiecki
 Irena Dubiska
 Paweł Łukaszewski
 Witold Maliszewski
 Aleksander Michałowski
 Stanisław Moniuszko
 Witold Rudziński
 Ada Sari
 Tadeusz Szeligowski
 Karol Szymanowski
 Józef Turczyński
 Kazimierz Wiłkomirski
 Stanisław Wisłocki
 Władysław Żeleński

Notable students

 Kari Amirian
 Grażyna Bacewicz
 Thomas Böttger
 Elisabeth Chojnacka
 Frédéric Chopin
 Mikalojus Konstantinas Čiurlionis
 Ignacy Feliks Dobrzyński
 Marian Filar
 Grzegorz Fitelberg
 Mieczysław Karłowicz
 Stefan Kisielewski
 Paweł Klecki
 Tomasz Konieczny
 Hilary Koprowski
 Bernard Ładysz
 Wanda Landowska
 Jerzy Lefeld
 Maciej Łukaszczyk
 Witold Lutosławski
 Jan Maklakiewicz
 Maciej Małecki
 Zygmunt Noskowski
 Jakub Józef Orliński
 Ignacy Jan Paderewski
 Andrzej Panufnik
 Olha Pasichnyk
 Piotr Perkowski
 Sergiusz Pinkwart
 Hania Rani
 Ludomir Różycki
 Sanah
 Antoni Szalowski
 Stanisław Szpinalski
 Adam Sztaba
 Tomasz Szukalski
 Alexandre Tansman
 Piotr Tomaszewski
 Zbigniew Turski
 Eugenia Umińska
 Moshe Vilenski
 Małgorzata Walewska
 Mieczysław Weinberg
 Kazimierz Wiłkomirski
 Roger Woodward

Competitions
The University organizes the following music competitions:
 the Tadeusz Wronski International Solo Violin Competition (Międzynarodowy Konkurs T. Wrońskiego na Skrzypce Solo)
 an International Organ Competition (Międzynarodowy Konkurs Organowy)
 the Wanda Landowska Harpsichord Competition (Międzynarodowy Konkurs Klawesynowy im. W. Landowskiej)
 the Witold Lutoslawski International Cello Competition (Międzynarodowy Konkurs Wiolonczelowy im. W. Lutosławskiego)

Orchestras
The University has two orchestras: a symphony orchestra, and the Chopin University Orchestra, as well as a choir.

Notes
a  Since at that time the Warsaw Conservatory was affiliated with  Warsaw University's Art Department, Chopin is also counted among the University's alumni.

Citations

References
  Home page
  Akademia Muzyczna w Warszawie, Encyklopedia WIEM

University of Music
Buildings and structures completed in 1966
Educational institutions established in 1810
Music schools in Poland
Universities and colleges in Warsaw

1810 establishments in Poland